Comlanvi Akakpo (born 30 January 1985 in Lomé) is a Beninese football player who currently plays in Benin for Tonnerre d'Abomey FC.

Career 
He began his career in his native Togo for Etoile Filante de Lomé and signed in January 2007 for Tonnerre d'Abomey FC.

International career
Akakpo is in the extended squad from the Benin national football team and represented the team at 2010 African Cup of Nations in Angola.

References

1985 births
Living people
Beninese footballers
Benin international footballers
Beninese people of Togolese descent
Sportspeople of Togolese descent
Expatriate footballers in Togo
Étoile Filante du Togo players
Sportspeople from Lomé
Tonnerre d'Abomey FC players

Association football defenders